The Danish Warmblood or Dansk Varmblod is a Danish breed of modern sport horse, established in the mid-twentieth century and used mainly for dressage and show-jumping. Like other European warmblood breeds, it is a performance breed: any suitable horse of any origin may be admitted if it passes a strict performance test. Hanoverian, Holsteiner, Swedish Warmblood and Trakehner are among those that have contributed to the breed.

History 

The first volume of the stud-book was published in 1964, and listed 150 mares. Most were imported from outside Denmark – more than 100 were of German breeding – and of the 22 born in Denmark the majority were of Oldenburger origin.

Characteristics 

The coat may be of any solid colour; bay is the most common, but chestnut, grey and dark bay also occur. Limited white markings may be present.

References 

Horse breeds
Warmbloods
Horse breeds originating in Denmark